William Pepper Jr. (August 21, 1843July 28, 1898), was an American physician, leader in medical education in the nineteenth century, and a longtime Provost of the University of Pennsylvania. In 1891, he founded the Free Library of Philadelphia.

Early life
Pepper was born in Philadelphia to Dr. William Pepper Sr. and Sarah Platt. He married Frances Sergent Perry, a member of the Perry family naval dynasty on June 25, 1873. They were the parents of four sons (William, Thomas, Benjamin, and Oliver Pepper). He was educated at the University of Pennsylvania, graduating from the college in 1862 and from the medical school in 1864.

Career
In 1868 Pepper became lecturer on morbid anatomy at the University of Pennsylvania School of Medicine and in 1870 lecturer on clinical medicine. From 1876 to 1887, he was professor of clinical medicine at Penn and in 1887 succeeded Dr Alfred Still as professor of theory and practice of medicine.

Pepper founded the Philadelphia Medical Times and was editor of that journal in 1870 and 1871. He was elected provost of the University of Pennsylvania in 1881 and remained in that position until 1894. For his services as medical director of the United States Centennial Exhibition at Philadelphia in 1876, he was made Knight Commander of Saint Olaf by King Oscar II of Sweden.

Pepper was the founder of Philadelphia's first free public library, chartered in 1891 through funds provided by the estate of his late uncle, which became the Free Library of Philadelphia, today the city's multi-branch public library system. He sponsored the Pepper-Hearst expedition (1895–1897) on the Gulf coast of Florida, near Tarpon Springs.

Pepper was known academically for his contributions to the theory and practice of medicine and the System of Medicine that he edited in 1885-86 became one of America's standard medical textbooks. He died July 28, 1898, at Pleasanton, California.

A bronze statue of Pepper by Karl Bitter stands on the south side of College Hall at the University of Pennsylvania. A replica of this stands on the landing of the main staircase of the Free Library of Philadelphia. In addition, a marble bust - also by Bitter - rests on a wooden base in the Edwin A. Fleisher Collection of Orchestral Music at the Free Library of Philadelphia.

Works

His contributions to the medical and scientific journals of the day included the following:
Trephining in Cerebral Disease (1871)
Local Treatment in Pulmonary Cavities (1874)
Catarrhal Irrigation (1881)
Epilepsy (1883)
Higher Medical Education: the True Interest of the Public and the Profession.

References

Further reading

External links
 Finding aid to the William Pepper papers Ms. Coll. 904 at the University of Pennsylvania Libraries
 
 
 

1843 births
1898 deaths
Physicians from Philadelphia
Perelman School of Medicine at the University of Pennsylvania alumni
19th-century American physicians
Chief Administrators of the University of Pennsylvania
Members of the American Philosophical Society
University of Pennsylvania alumni
University of Pennsylvania faculty
University of Pennsylvania Department of Biology faculty